The 1967 Caracas earthquake occurred in Caracas, Venezuela, and La Guaira, Vargas on 29 July at 8:00 p.m (UTC−04:00 at that time). Its epicenter took place in the litoral central (20 km from Caracas) and lasted 35 seconds. It heavily affected areas such as Altamira, Los Palos Grandes, and Litoral Central. In the aftermath of the earthquake, there were several aftershocks of lower intensity. The earthquake left a toll of 1,536 injured, 225–300 dead, and cost $50–140 million United States Dollars in property damage.

Events
At 8:05 p.m., Venezuelan time, Caracas was shaken by an earthquake that was recorded at 6.6 on the moment magnitude scale. The staff of the Cagigal Observatory could not precisely determine neither the epicenter nor the magnitude of the earthquake, because the pendulum seismometer’s needle straps broke and the photoelectric cells equipment also had imperfections. After the earthquake, the director of the observatory, ship Captain Ramiro Pérez Luciani, estimated that the epicenter was found in the Humocaro fault, Lara state, about 350 kilometers from Caracas; but the next day, examining the damage reports, he corrected his evaluation, placing it in the Caribbean Sea 70 km from the coast, in front of the Central Coast. The director of the Naval Observatory reported that he would have to resort to foreign specialized institutions in order to determine the data of the earthquake, due to damage to the seismological equipment.

In the Caracas Cathedral, located in the center of the city, a mass was being held when the earthquake occurred, as the stained glass windows of the temple suddenly exploded and the parishioners that were near, quickly escaped to Plaza Bolívar, Bogotá. In a few seconds the hundred year old Pontifical Cross, that crowned the facade, collapsed in free fall until it hit the ground, fragmenting into pieces and leaving a mark of their silhouette on the ground. One of those present would remember the event with the following words: "I saw when the cross came off and was engraved on the floor like a red-hot iron burn; in that precise moment the earthquake ceased," which made many people attribute this to a divine miracle and for several days the silhouette was venerated by the faithful until, on August 2, the authorities decided to remove the piece of concrete without giving much explanation. Now, after several decades of rumors and speculation around his whereabouts, the same piece is preserved in the Chapel of the Holy Christ of Mercy, located in the Valley sector.

At the same time, in Sonomatrix studios – located in the Antímano sector – sound technician Alejandro López, organist Tulio Enrique León and composer Germán Narvaez, were working on the recording of an instrumental track for a piece recorded by a children's choir a few days before. Three men fled from the studio during the seismic movement, the microphones, consoles and tape recording equipment remained in operation, thus preserving the only recorded sound of the tremor. Of this recording, the company FAVEDICA would much later publish a single disc with a brief narration that explained what happened and, in addition, included the single aforementioned musical composition alluding to the incident that occurred in the Cathedral of Caracas described above entitled: "The Miracle of the Cross", that was written by Oswaldo Oropeza and performed by Manuelita Sandoval together with the Ensemble of the Oropeza Brothers.

On the other hand, in one of the Cadena Venezolana TV studios, located in the Ruices sector, at the same time as a program special (that would be transmitted the 1st of August, when this television network’s third anniversary would be celebrated) was being recorded and, at the beginning of the Venezuelan folk singer Purita Reina’s concert, who was accompanied by the musical ensemble of Mario Suárez and the television station’s ballet, the cloud decoration began to move, jumping from top to bottom in sharp vertical movements. The lighting technician attracted the attention of the operators to this failure, meanwhile, the artists continued with their work until the movement of the decorations went from vertical to wavy and, when everyone present realized that an earthquake was happening, they fled in terror from the studio. Meanwhile the camera fell over and, according to reports by the press at the time of this incident, the recorded images clearly showed that the floor was moving in a wave direction until the camera eventually turned off. Also, in another studio for the channel, they found that there were more than 600 people waiting to see a wrestling tournament that was going to be broadcast live but, with the sole exception of the scare caused by the seismic movement. Fortunately, there were no victims to feel sadness for and the television station building was not damaged either.

The violent expansion covered the outer seismic zone of the Northern Caracas for a duration of about 55 seconds, which extends for more than 20 kilometers between the towns of Arrecifes and Naiguatá. These zones off the Central Coast, together with those of Altamira and Palos Grandes in Caracas, were the ones that had the most damage.

In Caraballeda, in the current Vargas state, five of the eleven floors of the “Charaima Mansion" were destroyed; a few months after they attempted to demolish the building with explosives and, where their goal was not achieved, a demolition ball had to be employed. Also, the Macuto Sheraton Hotel had heavy damage to their structures.

Damage
Damage was extensive in the Altamira and Los Palos Grandes sections of Caracas where four major apartment buildings, 10 to 12 stories high, collapsed. Many additional structures were severely damaged and several had to be razed and reconstructed.

Huge sections of walls fell from buildings, flattening cars below and leaving large portions of structures exposed. Rescue workers used cranes and bulldozers to search through the rubble for survivors or victims of the earthquake. A week after the shock, in Caraballeda, rescue operations continued for persons believed trapped beneath the floors of Mansion Charaima, an apartment building across the street from the Macuto Sheraton (which was also damaged). Maracay, about 50 miles west of Caracas, reported five deaths and 100 injuries. Several additional towns reported structural damage.

See also

 1641 Caracas earthquake
 1812 Caracas earthquake
 List of earthquakes in 1967
 List of earthquakes in Venezuela

References

Sources

External links

Sismologia Historica de Venezuela
The Influence of the 1967 Caracas Earthquake on Aseismic Design in the Commonwealth Caribbean – Venezuelan Foundation of Seismological Research

Earthquakes in Venezuela
Caracas Earthquake, 1967
Caracas
History of Caracas
July 1967 events in South America
1967 disasters in Venezuela